Champaran is a region of Bihar in India. It is now divided into an East Champaran district and a West Champaran district.

History 

In 1917, Gandhi lead a satyagraha movement in Champaran district against European land owners and government policies. During that time British landowners use to pressure local farmers to grow indigo and buy it in lower prices. In response British government arrested Gandhi and later released, did amendments to improve peasants situation. This was Gandhi's first movement in India.

Notable people 

 Manoj Bajpai – Indian film actor
 Dinesh Bhramar – poet and noted figure in Hindi and Bhojpuri literature
 Anuranjan Jha – Indian journalist
 Prakash Jha – Indian filmmaker
 Ramesh Chandra Jha – Indian poet, novelist and freedom fighter
 Abdullah Khan – novelist and screenwriter
 Ravish Kumar – Indian journalist
 Gopal Singh Nepali – Indian poet of Hindi literature, Bollywood lyricist
 George Orwell – English novelist, essayist, journalist and critic
 Kedar Pandey – Congress leader and ex-Chief Minister of Bihar
 Afroz Alam Sahil – Indian journalist
 Raj Kumar Shukla – indigo cultivator, activist
 Radha Mohan Singh – Indian politician
 Sanjeev K Jha – Indian script writer, filmmaker

References

Further reading 

Singh, Shankar Dayal. Gandhi's first step: Champaran movement, by  B.R. Pub. Corp., 1994. .
 Chakrabarti D.K. (1996b). From Purnea to Champaran: The distribution of sites in the north Bihar plains. South Asian Studies, 12:pp. 147–158

Historical regions
History of Bihar
Regions of Bihar
Mithila